Leandro da Silva (born 11 January 1989) is a Brazilian professional footballer who plays as a central defender.

Club career
Born in Rio Branco do Sul, Paraná, Silva started his professional career with Coritiba. He appeared with the first team in the 2009 edition of the Brazilian Cup, against CSA and Ponte Preta.

In that summer, Silva was bought by S.L. Benfica. He was immediately loaned to another side in the Portuguese Primeira Liga, Guimarães-based Vitória SC, being rarely used during the season.

On 25 March 2011, Silva returned to Brazil and signed a long-term contract with Paraná Clube. After failing to appear officially, however, he moved clubs and countries again, joining Doxa Katokopias F.C. from the Cypriot First Division.

International career
Silva was part of the Brazil under-20 squad at the 2009 South American Youth Championship, as the nation emerged victorious.

Honours
Brazil U20
South American Youth Championship: 2009

References

External links
Futpédia profile 
Coritiba official profile 

1989 births
Living people
Sportspeople from Paraná (state)
Brazilian footballers
Association football defenders
Coritiba Foot Ball Club players
Paraná Clube players
Primeira Liga players
S.L. Benfica footballers
Vitória S.C. players
Cypriot First Division players
Doxa Katokopias FC players
Nea Salamis Famagusta FC players
Brazil youth international footballers
Brazilian expatriate footballers
Expatriate footballers in Portugal
Expatriate footballers in Cyprus
Brazilian expatriate sportspeople in Portugal
Brazilian expatriate sportspeople in Cyprus